Arcadia High School is a high school in Arcadia, Wisconsin, USA. Small townships that attend Arcadia High School include the communities of Pine Creek, North Creek, Dodge, and Waumandee. The high school is located on the southern edge of the city and neighbors Memorial Park.

Arcadia High School was built in 1998 and houses grades 9–12. The school also offers learning opportunities for middle school students in the afternoon. Arcadia High School's enrollment is consistently less than 310. The school offers opportunities for the growing Latino population and holds a foreign exchange student program.

Courses
Courses taught at Arcadia High School include Agriculture, Anatomy, Genetics, Biology,  Accounting, Information Processing, and Introduction to Business.

Athletics
Arcadia High School men's sports include cross country, football, basketball, wrestling, golf, track, and baseball. Women's sports programs include cheer, cross country, volleyball, golf, gymnastics, basketball, dance team, softball, and track. The school competes in the Division 3 section of the Wisconsin Interscholastic Athletic Association (WIAA) in most sports. The football program competes in Division 5 and the track, wrestling  and gymnastics programs compete in Division 2.

Activities and Clubs
Arcadia High School offers a variety of different clubs. Such clubs include FFA, Computer Club, Librarian's club, A-Club, FBLA, FCCLA, NHS, and Masquers. The school also offers activities to keep the students engaged in school. These activities include Forensics and various wood shop activities.

References

External links
Arcadia School District

Public high schools in Wisconsin
Educational institutions established in 1998
1998 establishments in Wisconsin
Education in Trempealeau County, Wisconsin